Émile-Roger Lombertie (born 20 February 1951) is a French politician and physician.

He is current member of the Union for a Popular Movement Party and served as mayors of Limoges since 2014. He was elected mayor of Limoges by the municipal council on April 4, 2014. Émile Roger Lombertie then became the first mayor from the Limoges right, for 102 years and with the exception of the parenthesis André Faure during the Occupation. He became involved in politics during the 2014 municipal elections in Limoges. He was elected 8th vice-president of the Limoges Métropole urban community on April 15, 2014.

Biography
Emile was born in Champsac, France on 1951. Emile-Roger Lombertie works as a psychiatrist, head of hospital at the Limoges-Esquirol hospital. He is also noted for the promulgation of disputed by-laws aimed at limiting prostitution and begging in the city center.

References 

1951 births
Living people
Union for a Popular Movement politicians
The Republicans (France) politicians
20th-century French politicians
21st-century French politicians
People from Haute-Vienne
Mayors of places in Nouvelle-Aquitaine
Politicians from Nouvelle-Aquitaine
French psychiatrists